New Life Assembly of God is an evangelical megachurch affiliated with Assemblies of God, in Chennai, India, current Pentecostal. The senior pastor of this community is David Mohan. In 2020, the attendance is 320 people.

History 
The church was founded in 1973 by Pastor David Mohan. In 1999, the church added a service in English, led by Pastor Chadwick Mohan, the son of Pastor David. In 2004, attendance reached 320 people. In 2011, it hosted the International Congress of the Assemblies of God. In 2020, the Church had 320 people.

Outreach
The church has medical sponsorship activities in the surrounding rural villages of Chennai.

See also
List of the largest evangelical churches
List of the largest evangelical church auditoriums
Worship service (evangelicalism)

References

External links
 nlag.in - Official Website

Evangelical megachurches in India
Christian organizations established in 1973
Churches in Chennai
20th-century churches in India